Büderich may refer to:
, a borough of Meerbusch, Nordrhein-Westfalen, Germany
Büderich (Werl), a borough of Werl, Nordrhein-Westfalen, Germany
Büderich (Wesel), a borough of Wesel, Nordrhein-Westfalen, Germany
Prisoner of War camp Büderich, a 1945 American POW camp in Büderich (Wesel)
Péry, formerly called Büderich in German, canton of Bern, Switzerland